Kapitan China Kee Kim Swee (or Kee Kim Sui, also known as Kee Abdullah after he converted to Islam) was one of the prominent and important Chinese nationality (Hainanese) who settled in Tawau, Sabah. He was appointed as the first customs examiner and revenue collector by the British North Borneo (Chartered) Company in Tawau, 1894. A year later, Tawau development was entrusted to his hands by the British administration. He became the first Pengulu or Orang Kaya (OKK) in Tawau, Sabah. Tawau (also known as Tanjung) became a modern town under Kee Kim Swee's lead, as he engineered Tawau into a  business and commercial area in the early 1900s.

After he died, his son OKK Kee Abu Bakar became his successor as the Penghulu.

Early life and career

Kee Abdullah (Kee Kim Swee) was born in 1863. Little is known about his biological mother. He had a step-parent known by the name Kipas, a Dusun Tidong woman from Brunei.

In 1883, at the age of 20 years, as the courteous and respected Agent of the Company in Brunei, Kapitan Kee Kim Swee was appointed as Datuk Temenggung over the Chinese community by Sultan Abdul Momin.

In 1885, while on a trading journey with his father to Sandakan, their Tongkang boat encountered a mishap and capsized at the Marudu Bay. His father of Hainanese origin died in the incident and was buried in a Chinese cemetery in the district of Kudat, Sabah. Kee Kim Swee survived and was rescued by villagers. He settled in the residence of a Suluk man named Dato Husin until his recovery.

In 1894, Kee Kim Swee was recruited by the British North Borneo Chartered Company as a customs examiner and revenue collector in Tawau. One of his many tasks was to collect a one-dollar poll tax from the residents. His unique ability to converse in Arabic, and also Jawi literate, served as a link between the native and Chinese groups with the government. Thus, he was often called upon for his view and to provide representation.

Family

He converted to Islam when he married a Mindanao girl of Sulu Parang Tapol, Jumaatiah Ame Maidin, and later changed his name into Kee Abdullah.  His marriage with Jumaatiah gave him 18 children, 13 boys and 5 girls.

His children with Jumaatiah Ame Maidin:

 Kee Sulaiman (1897–1977)
 Kee Othman (1898–1970)
 OKK Kee Abu Bakar (1899–1953)
 Kee Abdul Aziz (unknown)
 Child name not recorded
 Kee Aishah (1906–1985)
 Kee Sidek (1909–1945)
 Kee Hatifah (1910–1969)
 Kee Ali (1913–1975)
 Kee A. Kamaruddin (1915-unknown)
 Kee A. Omar (1916–1931)
 Child name not recorded
 Kee Abdul Jalil (1919–1990)
 Kee Dzawiyah (1920–1921)
Some of the children's names were not recorded.

His early marriage with a Chinese woman from Kudat gave them 3 children, 2 boys and 1 girl. Both of his sons went back to China, while the girl changed her surname into "Chin" by marriage.

References

External links
 Kee Heritage Forum

1863 births
Sabah
History of Sabah
Tawau
British North Borneo
Year of death missing
People from British Borneo
Malaysian people of Chinese descent
Kadazan-Dusun people
Kapitan Cina